Efthimia Francesca Stephanidis, better known as just "Effie", is an outrageous comedic character played by Australian actress Mary Coustas. Coustas depicts a stereotypical second-generation Greek Australian.

History

Origins
The character originated in the popular Seven network comedy program Acropolis Now, which ran from 1989 to 1992. Since then, the character has appeared in Effie, Just Quietly (2001), and hosting the short-lived 2003 talk show Greeks On The Roof (based on the British series The Kumars at No. 42) in character with other actors playing her family.  She has also appeared in a number of television commercials (most recently for AAPT).

Effie's catchphrases include "How embarrassment!" (see malapropism) in response to any potentially embarrassing situation. She greets people with "Hello, good thanks" before they have even asked her how she is feeling.

1992: Recording
In 1992, "Effie" released a novelty single: a duet with another fictional character, Garry McDonald's Norman Gunston, recording their version of Andrew Lloyd Webber's "Amigos Para Siempre", the official song of the 1992 Summer Olympics (originally performed by Sarah Brightman and José Carreras). The single reached the Top 20 chart in Australia.

Coustas wrote a book based on the character: Effie’s Guide to Being Up Yourself, published in September 2003 by Mark McLeod Books.

2021 
Effie returned to the stage with Hello Good Thanks - Better Out Than In comedy show.

Discography

Singles

Awards

ARIA Music Awards
The ARIA Music Awards are a set of annual ceremonies presented by Australian Recording Industry Association (ARIA), which recognise excellence, innovation, and achievement across all genres of the music of Australia. They commenced in 1987.

! 
|-
| rowspan="2"| 1993 || "Amigos Para Siempre"/"Venereal Girl (Tribute to Madonna)"  (with Norman Gunston) || ARIA Award for Best Comedy Release ||  || 
|-

See also
 Malapropism

References

External links
Official Effie website
or is this the Official Effie website?
Effie hosts "Greek Dancing With The Stars" at the 2007 Paniyiri Festival, Brisbane, Australia
Effie and Norman Gunston sing Amigos Para Siempre on Hey, Hey, It's Saturday

Australian comedy
Australian people of Greek descent
Comedy television characters
Television characters introduced in 1989
Female characters in television